Sweden held a general election on 20 September 1998. Although the Social Democrats hung onto being the largest party and being the largest parliamentary bloc, the party had its worst election result in the unicameral Riksdag era at 36.4%. Both the Left Party and the Christian Democrats had record high results instead, while the Centre Party and People's Party had record low vote shares.

National results
There were 5,261,109 valid ballots cast, a sizeable decrease in turnout from the 1994 election, with turnout dropping from 86.8% to 81.4%.

Regional results

Percentage share

By votes

Results by statistical area
The modern national areas of Sweden were introduced in 2008, but the charts below include the counties that are part of those.

Percentage share

By votes

Constituency results

Percentage share

By votes

Municipal summary

Municipal results

Blekinge

Dalarna

Gotland

Gävleborg

Halland

Jämtland

Jönköping

Kalmar

Kronoberg

Norrbotten

Skåne

Malmö

Skåne NE

Skåne S

Skåne W
Although both blocs finished at 48.2%, the centre-right bloc won a plurality in Svalöv by 3,534 votes to 3,533.

Stockholm

Stockholm (city)

Stockholm County

Södermanland

Uppsala

Värmland

Västerbotten

Västernorrland

Västmanland

Västra Götaland

Gothenburg

Västra Götaland E

Västra Götaland N

Västra Götaland S

Västra Götaland W

Örebro

Östergötland

References

General elections in Sweden